Antônio Marcos de Oliveira, better known as Antônio Primo (born May 2, 1950) is a Brazilian politician. He was mayor of Buriticupu (2005–2013). Primo is the husband of Francisca Primo (PCdoB).

References 

Democratic Labour Party (Brazil) politicians
Brazilian Social Democracy Party politicians
Living people 
1950 births